The 2013 Country Music Association Awards, 47th Annual Ceremony, is a music award ceremony that was held on November 6, 2013, at the Bridgestone Arena in Nashville, Tennessee. The show was hosted for the sixth time by Brad Paisley and Carrie Underwood. At the ceremony, Taylor Swift became the second artist ever, and the first woman to receive the Pinnacle Award.

Winners and nominees 

Winners are shown in bold.

Special awards

Performers

Presenters

References 

Country Music Association
CMA
Country Music Association Awards
Country Music Association Awards
November 2013 events in the United States
2013 awards in the United States
21st century in Nashville, Tennessee
Events in Nashville, Tennessee